USS Tracer (AGR-15) was a , converted from a Liberty Ship, acquired by the US Navy in 1957. She was reconfigured as a radar picket ship and assigned to radar picket duty in the North Pacific Ocean as part of the Distant Early Warning Line.

Construction
Tracer (AGR-15) was laid down on 24 December 1944, under a Maritime Commission (MARCOM) contract, MC hull 2340, as the Liberty Ship Dudley H. Thomas, by J.A. Jones Construction, Panama City, Florida. She was launched 31 January 1945; sponsored by Mrs. Marion Harders; and delivered 21 February 1945, to the Moore McCormack Lines, Inc.

Service history

Merchant service
William J. Riddle operated with Moore-McCormack Lines and the Waterman Steamship Corporation from 1945 to 1947. When hostilities ended in the Far East in mid-August 1945, she was steaming from Hawaii to the Philippines.

Converted to a cattle carrier the following year, she operated as such through the end of 1946. Changed back to a dry cargo carrier by March 1947, she voyaged to European and Mediterranean ports until the summer of 1947, when she was laid up in MARCOM's James River Reserve Fleet, Lee Hall, Virginia. She remained there for 10 years.

US Navy service
The Navy selected William J. Riddle for conversion to a radar picket ship in May 1957. Towed to the Charleston Naval Shipyard, Charleston, South Carolina, conversion work began on 24 May 1957. Renamed Interrupter, and classified as AGR-15, she was commissioned at Charleston, 16 October 1958.
 
Following shakedown in Guantanamo Bay, Cuba, and post-shakedown availability at her conversion yard, Interrupter sailed for the Pacific Ocean. She transited the Panama Canal, on 26 January 1959, and arrived at her home port, San Francisco, California, on 12 February, the sixth AGR to join newly formed Radar Picket Squadron 1.
 
Fitted out with the latest radar detection equipment, Interrupter and her seven  sister ships were designed to serve as the seaborne eyes of the North American Air Defense Command (CONAD), the naval link in the chain of early-warning stations covering the Pacific approaches to the United States. Her mission was to "detect, report, and track enemy airborne threats approaching by overseas routes and to control the intercepts used to destroy such threats."
 
Before putting to sea for her first patrol, she conducted training evolutions with U.S. Air Force officers embarked on board for familiarization with the ship's mission. In addition, Interrupter's, officers and men familiarized themselves with the Air Force's part in this vital mission. On 6 March 1959, Interrupter sailed from San Francisco on her first barrier patrol.

On 4 September 1959, Interrupter was renamed Tracer to eliminate confusion with some of her sister ships with similarly sounding names.
 
Between 1959 and 1965, Tracer conducted patrols at sea, at various picket stations in the Western Contiguous Radar Line. The ship proved to be an efficient vessel and received awards for administrative and operational efficiency on several occasions. As more sophisticated early-warning systems came into operational use, the need for the AGRs diminished accordingly.

Decommissioning
Deactivated in 1965, Tracers name was struck from the Navy List on 1 September 1965. She was then transferred to the US Maritime Commission (MARCOM) and laid up at the Suisun Bay Reserve Fleet, Suisun Bay, California, where she remained until sold, 15 July 1974. Before being scrapped in China in 2000, Tracer, renamed Unisea, served as a fish processing plant in Unalaska, Alaska.

Honors and awards
Tracers crew was eligible for the following medals:
 National Defense Service Medal

References

Bibliography

External links 
 

 

Liberty ships
Ships built in Panama City, Florida
1945 ships
World War II merchant ships of the United States
Guardian-class radar picket ships
Cold War auxiliary ships of the United States
Wilmington Reserve Fleet
James River Reserve Fleet
Suisun Bay Reserve Fleet